Tina Berning (born 1969 in Braunschweig, West Germany) is a Berlin-based artist and illustrator. After working as a graphic designer for several years Tina Berning focused on drawing and Illustration in 2000. Since then her award-winning illustrations are published worldwide and are shown in many renowned anthologies. Tina Berning's illustrations have been featured in publications like The New York Times, Playboy (US and Germany), Vogue (Italia, Nippon, Germany), Die Zeit, Süddeutsche Zeitung, and Architectural Digest.

Her early passion for editorial illustration led her to an intensive contemplation on the human figure. Reflecting the female role in media is one of the core issues in her artistic work. Her work as a fine artist is shown regularly in solo exhibitions in the US, Germany, Japan, the Netherlands and Canada.

Exhibitions (selection) 
Solo exhibitions
 2016: Those Who Stay - Alison Milne Gallery | Toronto, Canada
 2010: Tina Berning: Selected Works - Alison Milne Gallery | Toronto, Canada
 2010: FACE/project (in collaboration with the photographer Michelangelo Di Battista) - gallery Camera Work | Berlin, Germany
 2009: The Passengers (catalog) - gallery Hanahou | New York, USA
 2009: The Listeners (catalog) - gallery Andreas Binder | Munich, Germany
 2008: No Nipples. No Guns. No Cigarettes. (catalog) - 2agenten, galerie für illustration | Berlin, Germany
 2007: 100 Girls On Cheap Paper (The New York Girls) - gallery Hanahou | New York, USA
 2007: 100 Girls On Cheap Paper (The Tokyo Girls) - gallery Lele | Tokyo, Japan
 2006: 100 Girls On Cheap Paper - gallery Donkersloot | Amsterdam, Netherlands
 2006: 100 Girls On Cheap Paper (catalog) - gallery Wallstreet-One | Berlin, Germany

Group exhibitions
 2011: Once Upon a Time - Alison Milne Gallery | Toronto, Canada
 2008: Fashion (in collaboration with the photographer Michelangelo Di Battista) - gallery Camera Work | Berlin, Germany
 2008: Presented by  2agenten - 2agenten, galerie für illustration | Berlin, Germany
 2008: Spread The Lead - gallery Hanahou | New York, USA
 2008: A Drawing A Day - gallery Hanahou | New York, USA
 2005: Bilderklub - gallery Wallstreet-One | Berlin, Germany

Publications
 2009: 100 Girls On Cheap Paper - One hundred drawings by  Tina Berning, published by Chronicle Books (Reprint), USA; 
 2009: The Passengers - Twentynine Drawings by  Tina Berning, catalog published by Gallery Hanahou, USA
 2009: The Listeners - Thirtynine Drawings by  Tina Berning, catalog published by Gallery Andreas Binder, Germany
 2008: No Nipples, No Guns, No Cigarettes - Thirtythree Drawings by  Tina Berning, catalog published by 2agenten, Gallery für illustration, Germany
 2006: 100 Girls On Cheap Paper - One hundred drawings by  Tina Berning, published by Printkultur, Germany;

References
 Website of the artist 
 Videointerview, Deutsche Welle (2010) 
 Website of the Bilderklub 

Living people
German artists
1969 births